Minamoto no Yoshitsuna (源 義綱) ( 1042 – 1134), also called Kamo Jirō (鴨 次郎), was a samurai of the Minamoto clan. He was son of Minamoto no Yoriyoshi and brother of Minamoto no Yoshiie and brother of Minamoto no Yoshimitsu.

In 1181 he fought in the Gosannen War along with his brother Minamoto no Yoshiie. After the war he revolted against his brother after a dispute in 1096 but failed. Then he was exiled to Izu Province and stayed there until his death in 1134.

References
Frederic, Louis (2002). "Japan Encyclopedia." Cambridge, Massachusetts: Harvard University Press.

Minamoto clan
1040s births
1134 deaths
People of Heian-period Japan
Deified Japanese people